Filip Polášek and Lukáš Rosol were the defending champions but decided not to participate together. Polášek partnered up Julian Knowle, while Rosol decided not to participate.
Christopher Kas and Philipp Kohlschreiber won the title winning against Knowle and Polášek by 7–5, 6–4.

Seeds

Draw

Draw

References
 Main Draw

Doubles